The 1965 ISF Women's World Championship for softball was the first edition of the Women's Softball World Championship. It was held in Melbourne, Australia.

Final standings

References

Women's Softball World Championship
Softball competitions in Australia
Sports competitions in Melbourne